Bathstore.com Ltd., (also known as bathstore) is the largest specialist bathroom retailer in the United Kingdom.

History
Bathstore was originally started in the beginning of the 1990s by Patrick Riley and Nico de Beer, with the idea to bring quality design led bathrooms into a wider retail arena. The company published one catalogue that contained all its products for the complete bathroom, with real retail prices.

The ethos was to focus on the home owner, rather than the trade buyer. Mr Watson announced plans to sell off Bathstore in November 2017.

It launched its first television advertising campaign in December 2006. In November 2007, its television advertisements used CGI technology for the first time, incorporating water animation to bring life and movement to the products being showcased. These advertisements were voiced by the star from Spooks and Cold Feet, Hermione Norris.

A period of rapid expansion and brand development under the leadership of executive chairman Nick Nearchou established the business as a speciality bathroom retailer, with more than 150 showrooms in the United Kingdom by the end of 2007. In 2009, the warehousing and delivery operation was transferred to DHL Supply Chain, at their facility at the Daventry International Railfreight Terminal near Crick.

In May 2012, bathstore was acquired by the turnaround specialist company Endless LLP from Wolseley PLC, as a non core asset acquisition for £15 million cash.

In June 2014, bathstore was sold as part of a management buyout led by chief executive Gary Favell. In April 2017, bathstore branched out into kitchens and bedrooms. They opened two new fascia Haus Stores in Farnborough and Lakeside, having acquired two former Betta Living premises on 14 April 2017.

On 26 June 2019, bathstore went into administration. At the time, bathstore had 135 stores in the United Kingdom, employing over five hundred people. In July 2019, it was announced that Homebase had purchased over forty four stores, and that all remaining stores would cease trading once stock was sold.

Awards and recognition
The company was nominated and shortlisted for the Retail Week Awards, as the Best Specialist Retailer in 2007 and 2008.

References

External links
 Corporate website

Home improvement companies of the United Kingdom
Companies based in Watford
Retail companies established in 1990
Companies that have entered administration in the United Kingdom